The Guardians of the Directions (Sanskrit: दिक्पाल, Dikpāla) are the deities who rule the specific directions of space according to Hinduism, Jainism and  Buddhism—especially . As a group of eight deities, they are called  (अष्ट-दिक्पाल), literally meaning guardians of eight directions. In Hinduism it is traditional to represent their images on the walls and ceilings of Hindu temples. They are also often portrayed in Jain temples, with the exception that Nāga usually takes the place of Vishnu in the nadir. Ancient Java and Bali Hinduism recognize , literally meaning guardians of nine directions, that consist of eight directions with one addition in the center. The nine guardian gods of directions is called Dewata Nawa Sanga (Nine guardian devata). The diagram of these guardian gods of directions is featured in Surya Majapahit, the emblem of Majapahit empire.

There are strong similarities between the concept of the guardians of the directions and the lore surrounding the Chinese four symbols, four ancestral spirits who are responsible for four of the cardinal directions (North, South, East, and West).

Directions in Hindu tradition
There are four primary directions and a total of 10 directions.

Lokapālas
In Hinduism, the guardians of the cardinal directions are called the s (लोकपाल), or Dikpalaka. Three main distinctions of Dikpalaka are recognized, being:

("Guardians of Eight Directions")

("Guardians of Ten Directions")
Besides the eight guardians, the following are added:
 Brahma (Zenith, meaning "the farthest up from the gravitational force")
 Vishnu (Nadir, meaning "the direction in which gravity pulls")

("Guardians of Nine Directions")

(Called Dewata Nawa Sanga in ancient Java and Bali Hinduism)

 Shiva (Center)
 Vishnu (North)
 Brahma (South)
 Isvara (East)
 Mahadeva (West)
 Sambhu (Northeast)
 Mahesora (Southeast)
 Sangkara (Northwest)
 Rudra (Southwest)

See also

 Bacab
 Bhairava
 Diggaja
 Dikpali
 Four Heavenly Kings
 Four sons of Horus
 Mahavidya
 Maitei Ngaakpa Lai
 Matrikas
 Norðri, Suðri, Austri and Vestri
 Titan

Notes

References

External links

 
 
Hindu gods
Onmyōdō deities